Çardaklı can refer to:

 Çardaklı, Atkaracalar
 Çardaklı, Göle
 Çardaklı, Hani
 Çardaklı, Hasankeyf
 Çardaklı, Üzümlü